Noel Bloom may refer to:
 Noel C. Bloom (born 1942), American businessman and pornography film director
 Noel C. Bloom, Jr. (born 1977), American former basketball player and coach, son of Noel Bloom, Sr.